Aidingimonas is a genus in the phylum Pseudomonadota (Bacteria).

Etymology
The name Aidingimonas derives from: New Latin noun Aidingum, Aiding (a lake located in Xinjiang province of north-west China); and monas (μονάς), monad a unit, a monad; New Latin thus Aidingimonas, a monad from Aiding Lake.

Members of the genus Aidingimonas can be referred to as aidingimonads (viz. Trivialisation of names).

Species
The genus contains a single species, namely A. halophila ( Wang et al. 2009,  type species of the genus); hals, halos (ἅλς, ἁλός), salt; and phila  philē (φίλη)), friend, loving; thus halophila, salt-loving).

See also
 Bacterial taxonomy
 Microbiology

References 

Monotypic bacteria genera
Oceanospirillales
Bacteria genera